Tehreek-e-Jafaria (TJP) was a Shia political party, which was founded in 1979 by Syed Arif Hussain Al Hussaini.Its creation coincided with the enforcement of controversial Islamic laws by then President of Pakistan, General Mohammad Zia-ul-Haq. At the same time, 1979 Iranian Revolution in Shi'a Iran added extra confidence and comfort in the movement.

Jafaria Students Organization Pakistan, founded in 1997, was the student wing of TJP.

History

Foundation 
It was founded by a committee of Shia ulema, and Syed Muhammad Dehlavi of Karachi was elected its first president. After his demise, Mufti Jafar Hussain was elected its president. After Mufti Jafar Hussain's demise, the young Arif Hussain al-Hussaini was asked by senior ulema like Ayatollah Muhammad Hussain Najafi and Safdar Hussain Najafi to accept the leadership. After Arif Hussain's assassination, Sajid Naqvi was elected the next president. Hassan Turabi was the head of party in Sindh province, like Taqi Naqvi heads the party in Punjab.

Deaths 
After the death of Mufti Jafar Hussain TNFH split into two groups named TNFJ-Agha Syed Hamid Ali Shah Moosavi group and TNFJ-Arif Hussaini group respectively due to ideological differences between the two leaders. Arif Hussain Hussaini, a student of Ruhollah Khomeini who led the Iranian Revolution, was the group's leader.

Later in 1988, Arif Hussain Hussaini changed the name of his group from TNFJ-Arif Hussaini group to Tehreek-e-Jafaria (TJP) while Agha Syed Hamid Ali Shah Moosavi's group retained the name of TNFJ and has been operating under the same name since. The TJP founder, Arif Hussain Hussaini was assassinated in 1988 by unknown attackers.

Arif Hussain Hussaini, the patron-in-chief of the TJP, was shot dead in Peshawar near his mosque/seminary while going to lead the morning prayer on August 5, 1988. Then T.J.P. was led by Hussaini's one of the foremost companions Syed Sajid Ali Naqvi.

On October 19, 2001, TJP leader Nazir Ahmed Abbas was shot and killed at his shop in the city of Vehari, located in the Punjab province.

Following the death of Zia-ul-Haq, support for the TJP fell, as Pakistani Shias went back to pre-Zia-ul-Haq political loyalties, with many no longer feeling under threat. Furthermore, the elections of moderate Benazir Bhutto also gave increased confidence to Shia Muslims and they were no longer under threat and the discrimination ended even though it still exist against the Pakistani Shias.

Sanctions 
On January 12, 2002, the TJP was banned along with three terrorist organizations, by the government of Pakistan.

The TJP was banned twice by Pervez Musharraf's government and in January 2002, its leaders were arrested. The T.J.P. was banned again on November 5, 2011, while Pakistan's Shias experienced increasing attacks since 2005 by the Pakistani Taliban, Sipah-e-Sahaba, Lashkar-e-Jhangvi, Jundullah and Jaish-e-Mohammed,

Although TJP has been designated as a "terrorist organisation", Qazi Hussain Ahmad, a senior member of Pakistani Parliament and the leader of Jamaat-e-Islami, Pakistan's oldest Islamist party, says he banned groups have no ties with the militants. He notes that one organization is part of the Muttahida Majlis-e-Amal, the major opposition alliance of religious parties, which also includes Ahmad's group.

Ideology
According to TJP, Islam is and was the basic ideology of Pakistan; by deviating this ideology a conspiracy was made to make Pakistan a sectarian state in the period of General Zia-ul-Haq, a dictator. At this stage, the formation of TNFJ was deemed necessary for the failure of this conspiracy.

The main objective of this organisation was to protect the rights of Shia Muslims of Pakistan and give them a voice in the Parliament of Pakistan. They do not advocate a Shia Islamic state and have cordial relations with Sunni organization including Sunni Ittehad Council, that is why they joined the coalition of religious political parties Muttahida Majlis-e-Amal that won 53 out of 272 elected members in legislative elections held on October 20, 2002.

Coalition
It was a part of the Muttahida Majlis-e-Amal coalition of Islamist political parties that won 11.3% of the popular vote and 53 out of 272 seats in the legislative elections held on October 20, 2002. In May 2008, it was reported that Jamaat-e-Islami Pakistan's emir Qazi Hussain Ahmad was considered heading the six-party Muttahida Majlis-e-Amal. Qazi Hussain Ahmad said that he would consider rejoining the MMA after consulting with the executive council of his party and some other seniors. Jamiat Ulema-e-Islam (F)'s chief Fazl-ur-Rahman had tasked Sajid Naqvi of TJP with contacting Qazi Hussain Ahmad and bringing him round to rejoining the alliance.

Tehreek-e-Jafaria and the Pakistan Taliban became active in the area in mid-2007. The former Tehreek-e-Jafaria was founded by a local Afridi tribesman named Muneer Khan, while the Islamic Taliban was founded by Momin Afridi. The groups later merged and became part of the Tehrik-i-Taliban Pakistan. Both leaders were killed in a military operation in the area in 2008.

See also
 Jafaria Students Organization Pakistan
 Majlis Wahdat-e-Muslimeen
 Shia Ulema Council
 Imamia Students Organization

References 

Shia Islamic political parties
Political parties in Pakistan
Organisations designated as terrorist by Pakistan
Shia Islam in Pakistan
Terrorism in Pakistan
Far-right political parties in Pakistan
Rebel groups in Pakistan
Organizations based in Asia designated as terrorist
Muttahida Majlis-e-Amal